Aguner Poroshmoni is a 1994 film based on the novel of the same name written and directed by Humayun Ahmed. The film won National Film Award in eight categories including Best Picture, Best Director and Best Plot. It was the first movie directed by Humayun Ahmed.

About
Humayun Ahmed made his debut as a film-maker by releasing the film. It was a time when the middle-class people of the country had long turned their backs on Bangla cinemas. Unconventional plot, humorous dialogues, lively characters and unique style of story line were the landmarks of the film.

Cast
 Asaduzzaman Noor as Bodi
 Bipasha Hayat as Ratri
 Abul Hayat as Motin
 Dolly Johur as Surma
 Dilara Zaman
 Shila Ahmed as Opala
 Hosne Ara Putul as Binti, the housemaid
 Mozammel Hossain
 Salehuddin Ahmed as tea stall owner
 Tithi Haque
 Borna Priyadarshini
 Lutfur Rahman George

Music

The music of the film is scored by Satya Saha. Songs of Rabindranath Tagore and Hason Raja are used in the film.

Awards
This film won Bangladesh National Film Award in 8 categories including Best Film, Best Screenplay, Best Actress.

References

External links

1994 films
1990s war drama films
Bangladeshi war drama films
Bangladesh Liberation War
Bengali-language Bangladeshi films
Films based on the Bangladesh Liberation War
Films set in the 1970s
Films scored by Satya Saha
Films directed by Humayun Ahmed
1994 directorial debut films
1990s Bengali-language films
1994 drama films
Best Film National Film Award (Bangladesh) winners
Government of Bangladesh grants films